Orest Panchyshyn (born 30 August 2000) is a professional Ukrainian football midfielder who plays for Kremin Kremenchuk.

Career
Born in Novoyavorivsk, Panchyshyn is a product of the UFK-Karpaty Lviv youth sportive school system. His first trainers were Volodymyr Vilchynskyi and Ivan Pavlyukh. But before joined UFK-Karpaty, he was trained by Zinoviy Pisyura in the football section in his native town.

He played for FC Karpaty in the Ukrainian Premier League Reserves and later was promoted to the senior squad team, when Karpaty was relegated into the Ukrainian Second League. Panchyshyn made his debut for FC Karpaty as the main-squad player in the losing away match against FC Karpaty Halych on 27 September 2020 in the Ukrainian Second League, but in January 2021 signed contract with the Ukrainian Premier League FC Mynai.

References

External links
 
 

2000 births
Living people
People from Novoyavorivsk
Ukrainian footballers
Association football midfielders
FC Karpaty Lviv players
FC Mynai players
FC Kremin Kremenchuk players
Ukrainian First League players
Ukrainian Second League players
Sportspeople from Lviv Oblast